The 2012 AFC Cup group stage was contested by a total of 32 teams (20 from West Asia Zone and 12 from East Asia Zone). They included:
28 teams which directly entered the 2012 AFC Cup group stage (17 from West Asia Zone and 11 from East Asia Zone)
3 losers of the 2012 AFC Champions League qualifying play-off final round (2 from West Asia Zone and 1 from East Asia Zone)
1 winner of the 2012 AFC Cup qualifying play-off (from West Asia Zone)

The draw for the group stage was held at the AFC house in Kuala Lumpur, Malaysia on 6 December 2011, 15:00 UTC+08:00. The 32 teams were drawn into eight groups of four. Clubs from the same country may not be drawn into the same group.

In each group, teams played each other home-and-away in a round-robin format. The matchdays were 6–7 March, 20–21 March, 3–4 April, 10–11 April, 24–25 April, and 8–9 May 2012. The winners and runners-up of each group advanced to the knockout stage.

Tiebreakers
The teams are ranked according to points (3 points for a win, 1 point for a tie, 0 points for a loss) and tie breakers are in following order:
Greater number of points obtained in the group matches between the teams concerned;
Goal difference resulting from the group matches between the teams concerned;
Greater number of goals scored in the group matches between the teams concerned; (Away goals do not apply)
Goal difference in all the group matches;
Greater number of goals scored in all the group matches;
Kicks from the penalty mark if only two teams are involved and they are both on the field of play;
Fewer score calculated according to the number of yellow and red cards received in the group matches; (1 point for each yellow card, 3 points for each red card as a consequence of two yellow cards, 3 points for each direct red card, 4 points for each yellow card followed by a direct red card)
Drawing of lots.

Groups
Each team had been numbered from 1 to 4, the numbers determine the order of the fixtures:
Match Day 1: 1 vs 4, 3 vs 2
Match Day 2: 2 vs 1, 4 vs 3
Match Day 3: 1 vs 3, 4 vs 2
Match Day 4: 3 vs 1, 2 vs 4
Match Day 5: 4 vs 1, 2 vs 3
Match Day 6: 1 vs 2, 3 vs 4

Group A

Notes
Note 1: Due to the political crisis in Syria, the AFC requested Syrian clubs to play their home matches at neutral venues.

Group B

Notes
Note 2: Due to the political crisis in Yemen, the AFC requested Yemeni clubs to play their home matches at neutral venues.

Group C

Group D

Group E

Notes
Note 3: Due to the political crisis in Yemen, the AFC requested Yemeni clubs to play their home matches at neutral venues.
Note 4: Due to the political crisis in Syria, the AFC requested Syrian clubs to play their home matches at neutral venues.

Group F

Group G

Group H

References

External links
 

Group stage